Soyaltepec Mixtec is a moribund Mixtec language of Oaxaca spoken in the villages of San Bartolo Soyaltepec and Guadalupe Gabilera. It is not close to other varieties of Mixtec.

References 

Mixtec language